"Nonsense" is a song recorded by American singer Sabrina Carpenter for her fifth studio album Emails I Can't Send (2022). The track was written by Carpenter and Steph Jones, while Julian Bunetta handled its production. Originally released alongside the album as its ninth track, "Nonsense" became the album's fifth single after gaining traction on the video-sharing app TikTok, characterized by listeners as a fan-favorite and bolstering comparisons to the works of artists like Ariana Grande.

An accompanying music video for "Nonsense" was released on November 10, 2022. Additionally, a sped-up version and a holiday remix, entitled "A Nonsense Christmas", were released. As of March 2023, the song has reached the top 10 in the Netherlands, the Phillippines, and Singapore, as well as number 36 on the Billboard Global 200 chart.

Background and release
On June 30, 2022, Carpenter announced the release of her fifth studio album, Emails I Can't Send (2022), and unveiled its tracklist on July 5 via her social media accounts, where "Nonsense" was to be the ninth track on the album. The song was released on July 15, 2022, alongside the rest of the album.

During her Emails I Can't Send Tour, Carpenter began altering the song's outro while performing it to fit the city she was performing in. The various ad-libbed moments proceeded to go viral on the video-sharing social media app TikTok. The song's virality, along with having become an immediate fan-favorite off Emails I Can't Send, led Carpenter to choose "Nonsense" as the album's next single.

Carpenter released a Christmas version of the song, where she put a "more festive, flirty spin" on various lyrics from the original.

Commercial performance
"Nonsense" initially debuted at number 8 on the US Bubbling Under Hot 100 chart, an extension of the Billboard Hot 100, on the chart December 24, 2022, and spent 3 weeks on the chart. On the chart dated January 28, 2023, "Nonsense" debuted at number 75 on the Hot 100, becoming the album's first single to chart and earning Carpenter her second career entry after her 2021 single "Skin" . During the tracking week of its chart debut, the track received over 5.82 million on-demand streams in the United States alone, which was a 66% spike from its previous week in streaming data. Globally, "Nonsense" has reached number 73 on the Global 200 chart. 

"Nonsense" initially debuted at number 69 on the UK Singles Chart, on the chart January 26, 2023 (week ending), entering the top 40 a week later at number 32. This became Carpenter's second UK top 40 single following "Skin" which peaked at number 28 in February 2021.

Music video
The music video for "Nonsense", directed by Danica Kleinknecht, premiered on her Vevo channel via YouTube on Thursday, November 10, 2022.

Track listing
 Digital download / streaming – Sped Up version
 "Nonsense" – 2:43
 "Nonsense" (Sped Up version) – 2:17

 Digital download / streaming – "A Nonsense Christmas"
 "A Nonsense Christmas" – 2:33
 "Nonsense" – 2:43

Charts

Release history

References

2022 songs
2022 singles
Sabrina Carpenter songs
Island Records singles
Songs written by Sabrina Carpenter